"Debaser" is a song by American alternative rock band Pixies, and is the first song on their 1989 album Doolittle. The song was written and sung by frontman Black Francis and was produced by Gil Norton during Doolittle's recording sessions.

Releases
The "Head On" single includes a live version of the song recorded in Chicago on August 9, 1989, and a recording from Debaser December 16, 2004, in New York City appears on "Hey" – Live Pixies 2004–2005. "Debaser" was later released as a single in 1997 to promote the Death to the Pixies compilation. The single appeared in three forms: live, studio and demo.

A version of this song was also used in the game DJ Hero 2, remixed with The Prodigy's song "Invaders Must Die"; this mix is available as downloadable content for the game.

Lyrics and meaning
The lyrics are based on a surrealist film by Luis Buñuel and Salvador Dalí called Un Chien Andalou. The film includes a scene in which a woman's eye is slit by a razor, which is referenced in the song lyric "Slicin' up eyeballs/I want you to know." According to Black Francis:

I wish Buñuel were still alive. He made this film about nothing in particular. The title itself is a nonsense. With my stupid, pseudo-scholar, naive, enthusiast, avant-garde-ish, amateurish way to watch Un chien andalou (twice), I thought: 'Yeah, I will make a song about it.' [He sings:] "Un chien andalou"... It sounds too French, so I will sing "un chien andalusia", it sounds good, no?

The title "Debaser" references the fact that Un Chien Andalou debases morality and standards of art, according to Black Francis. In the earliest version of the song, the line "un chien andalusia" was originally "Shed, Apollonia!"—a reference to a scene in the Prince film Purple Rain.

In 2022, Black Francis elaborated on the song's meaning: "I guess it means: one who debases. A debaser. It was an attempt to introduce a new word into the lexicon, but I don’t think it’s been successful, else I would have heard about it."

Track listing
Debaser – Demo
"Debaser" (Demo) – 2:59
"No. 13 Baby" (Demo) – 3:10

Debaser – Live
"Debaser" (Live in Chicago, August 10, 1989) – 2:44
"Holiday Song" (Live in Chicago, August 10, 1989) – 2:10
"Cactus" (Live in Chicago, August 10, 1989) – 2:27
"Nimrod's Son" (Live in Chicago, August 10, 1989) – 3:08

Debaser – Studio
"Debaser" – 2:52
"Bone Machine" (Live in Netherlands, 1990) – 3:03
"Gigantic" (Live in Netherlands, 1990) – 3:24
"Isla de Encanta" (Live in Netherlands, 1990) – 1:44

Charts

References

1997 singles
Pixies (band) songs
Songs written by Black Francis
Elektra Records singles
1989 songs
Song recordings produced by Gil Norton